MFC HIT Kyiv  (ukr. Міні-Футбольний Клуб «ХІТ» Київ), is a futsal club from Kyiv, Ukraine, and plays in Ukrainian Men's Futsal Championship.

Honours
 Extra-Liga:
 4th place: 2016/17, 2017/18
 Ukrainian Futsal Cup:
 Runner-up: 2014/15, 2015/16, 2016/17

References

External links 
  Official web site
  Footballfacts profile

Futsal clubs in Ukraine
Sport in Kyiv
Futsal clubs established in 2005
2005 establishments in Ukraine